Fabrice Santoro and Nenad Zimonjić were the defending champions. They were both present but did not compete together. 
Santoro partnered with Richard Gasquet, but lost in the semifinals to Zimonjic and partner Daniel Nestor, who lost in the final.

Bob Bryan and Mike Bryan won in the final 3–6, 6–4, [10–8], against Daniel Nestor and Nenad Zimonjić.

Seeds
All seeds receive a bye into the second round.

Draw

Finals

Top half

Bottom half

External links
Draw

Italian Open - Doubles
Men's Doubles

fr:Masters de Rome 2008#Double messieurs